Zonia Vialat was an All-American Girls Professional Baseball League player.

Little is known about this woman who had an extremely short career in the league.

Born in Havana, Zonia Vialat was one of seven girls born in Cuba to play in the All-American Girls Professional Baseball League in its twelve-year history. Besides her, other Cubanas who played in the league were Luisa Gallegos, Mirtha Marrero, Migdalia Pérez and Gloria Ruiz. All of them debuted in 1948. The next year were added Isabel Alvarez and Isora del Castillo.

Vialat appeared in only one game with the Springfield Sallies before returning to Cuba. She went hitless in one at bat and did not have fielding chances.

In 1988 was opened Women in Baseball, a permanent display based at the Baseball Hall of Fame and Museum in Cooperstown, New York, which was unveiled to honor the entire All-American Girls Professional Baseball League. It was not really a well known fact until filmmaker Penny Marshall premiered her 1992 film A League of Their Own, which was a fictionalized account of activities in the AAGPBL. Starring Geena Davis, Tom Hanks, Madonna, Lori Petty and Rosie O'Donnell, this film brought many of the real AAGPBL former players a rebirth of celebrity.

In 2011, Zonia Vialat and her AAGPBL teammates from Cuba were honored by having their names and photos presented at a ceremony in New York City. The event was presented by Leslie Heaphy, history professor at Kent State University of Ohio, during the Cuban Baseball Congress held on August 20 at Fordham University.

Sources

All-American Girls Professional Baseball League players
Baseball players from Havana
Date of birth unknown
Year of birth unknown
Date of death unknown
Year of death unknown
Place of death missing